Brusque may refer to:

 Brusque, Aveyron, France
 Brusque, Santa Catarina, Brazil
 Brusque Futebol Clube, Brazilian football (soccer) club

People with the surname
 Nicolas Brusque (born 1976), French rugby union footballer